Feng "Franklin" Tao (born August 28, 1971) is a chemical engineer who was a Miller Associate Professor at the University of Kansas. His research areas of specialization are heterogeneous catalysis, energy chemistry, nanoscience and surface science. He has published over 180 papers in international journals. 

Tao served on the advisory boards of Chemical Society Reviews and Catalysis Science & Technology.

Education 
Tao received his Ph.D. in the field of Physical Chemistry from Princeton University, followed by his postdoctoral research in catalysis at University of California at Berkeley.

Research and career 
Tao did research on the In Situ studies of chemistry & structure of materials in reactive environments, and conducted his further studies on reactor for tracking catalyst nanoparticles in liquid at high temperature under a high-pressure gas phase with X-ray absorption spectroscopy.

Tao started his career as an assistant professor at the University of Notre Dame in 2014. During his tenure at the University of Kansas, he became Miller Associate Professor in the Department of Chemical & Petroleum Engineering and Chemistry and also serves as the Director of Nanocatalysis for Chemical and Energy Transformations Lab.

Federal charges 
In 2019, the United States Department of Justice indicted Tao for 'failing to disclose conflict of interest with a Chinese university', as the first case of its China Initiative. The evidence used by the Department of Justice was obtained after Tao was reported to the FBI for alleged espionage by a vengeful co-author, who presented manufactured evidence to the FBI. Based on this evidence, the FBI obtained a search warrant. Tao was subsequently indicted for an email regarding a contract to teach in China, but not for alleged espionage. Tao and his lawyer have rebutted the accusations, claiming that the contract was neither signed nor accepted by Tao. Using a GoFundMe campaign and loans from family members, Tao and his family raised "hundreds of thousands of dollars" to fund their defense.

On April 7, 2022, Tao was convicted by a jury of "three counts of wire fraud and one count of false statements" for not disclosing the contract on conflict of interest forms.

On September 20, 2022, a federal judge threw out the three convictions of wire fraud, leaving the count of making false statements on a form. The judge ruled that prosecutors had not provided sufficient evidence to prove the wire fraud convictions.
On January 18, 2023, the judge sentenced Tao time served and supervised release, with no additional prison time, saying his case "is not an espionage case" and the prosecutor presented no evidence that Tao received any money for his work in China. 
The judge also noted that Tao had published 16 papers and a book while working at home on unpaid administrative leave since being banned from KU's campus in 2019, saying that such a high level of productivity was indicative of his "continued value to society."

Personal life 
Tao is married to Hong Peng, a radiologist.

Awards and honors 
2017, Fellow of the American Association for the Advancement of Science (AAAS)
2014, Miller Research Award
2014, NSF CAREER Award 
2012, AVS Paul Holloway Award
2007, IUPAC Young Chemists Award

See also 

 Gang Chen (engineer), another Chinese-American scientist controversially indicted as part of the China Initiative

References 

1971 births
Living people
Princeton University alumni
University of Kansas faculty
American chemical engineers
University of Notre Dame faculty
Fellows of the American Association for the Advancement of Science
Fellows of the Royal Society of Chemistry